Thelma's agonopterix moth (Agonopterix thelmae) is a moth of the family Depressariidae. It is found in North America from New England to South Carolina, west to Kentucky and Illinois, north to Michigan and southern Ontario.

The wingspan is about 21 mm. The forewings are yellowish-brown with extensive dark speckling. There is a blackish smudge near the middle of wing, bordered by a reddish-orange smudge below. A diffuse gray shade line runs diagonally from the middle of the wing toward the inner margin, then bends sharply and runs diagonally toward the apex. The hindwings are uniformly brownish-gray.

Adults are on wing from July to October in Kentucky and from August to September in southern Ontario.

References

Agonopterix
Moths described in 1941
Moths of North America